Following are lists of members of the Northern Territory Legislative Assembly:

 Members of the Northern Territory Legislative Assembly, 1974–1977 (1st parliament)
 Members of the Northern Territory Legislative Assembly, 1977–1980 (2nd parliament)
 Members of the Northern Territory Legislative Assembly, 1980–1983 (3rd parliament)
 Members of the Northern Territory Legislative Assembly, 1983–1987 (4th parliament)
 Members of the Northern Territory Legislative Assembly, 1987–1990 (5th parliament)
 Members of the Northern Territory Legislative Assembly, 1990–1994 (6th parliament)
 Members of the Northern Territory Legislative Assembly, 1994–1997 (7th parliament)
 Members of the Northern Territory Legislative Assembly, 1997–2001 (8th parliament)
 Members of the Northern Territory Legislative Assembly, 2001–2005 (9th parliament)
 Members of the Northern Territory Legislative Assembly, 2005–2008 (10th parliament)
 Members of the Northern Territory Legislative Assembly, 2008–2012 (11th parliament)
 Members of the Northern Territory Legislative Assembly, 2012–2016 (12th parliament)
 Members of the Northern Territory Legislative Assembly, 2016–2020 (13th parliament)
 Members of the Northern Territory Legislative Assembly, 2020–2024 (14th parliament)

See also
 List of Northern Territory by-elections
 List of Northern Territory ministries